Kym Crosby (born February 14, 1993) is an American para-track and field athlete who competed at the 2016 Summer Paralympics in the T13 100 metres and 400 metres. She won the bronze medal in the 100 metres and set a personal best.

Early life
Crosby was born on February 14, 1993, in Marysville, California to parents Paul and Pauline Crosby. She was born with albinism which left her legally blind. Upon her brother's encouragement, Crosby competed in track and field during her high school years.

Career
After graduating from River Valley High School, Crosby enrolled in California State University, Chico and competed on their track team. As a junior at Chico, Crosby qualified for the United States Paralympic team and made their 2016 Summer Paralympics roster. In her debut Games, Crosby competed in the T13 100 metres and 400 metres. Although she set a personal record during the 400 meters with a time of 57.26 seconds, Crosby finished fourth in the T13 finals. She garnered greater success in the Women's 100 meters race and earned herself a bronze medal.

Personal life
Crosby became engaged to wheelchair racer Erik Hightower on May 8, 2017.

See also 
 United States at the 2016 Summer Paralympics

References 

1993 births
Living people
American female sprinters
Paralympic track and field athletes of the United States
Athletes (track and field) at the 2016 Summer Paralympics
Athletes (track and field) at the 2020 Summer Paralympics
Medalists at the 2016 Summer Paralympics
Medalists at the 2020 Summer Paralympics
People from Marysville, California
California State University, Chico alumni
Medalists at the 2019 Parapan American Games
Track and field athletes from California
Chico State Wildcats
College women's track and field athletes in the United States
20th-century American women
21st-century American women